"Half Mast (Slight Return)" is a song by Australian electronic music duo Empire of the Sun, released on 15 January 2010 as a digital download available through the iTunes Store in Australia only. The song was taken as the fifth single from their debut album Walking on a Dream. Virgin Records and EMI Music released it as a radio promotion single on 8 February 2010 and on iTunes on 16 April 2010.

It is a remixed version of album track "Half Mast".

The music video for "Half Mast (Slight Return)" was filmed in New York City, featuring Luke Steele and actress Teresa Palmer and was directed by Nash Edgerton. The music video was released on 19 March 2010 on the band's YouTube site.

The song was sampled by Pittsburgh-based rapper Mac Miller for his song "The Spins" on the mixtape K.I.D.S..

Track listing
 "Half Mast (Slight Return)" (radio edit) – 3:37
 "Half Mast (Slight Return)" (instrumental) – 3:35

References

2009 songs
2010 singles
Empire of the Sun (band) songs
Songs written by Luke Steele (musician)
Songs written by Nick Littlemore
Songs written by Peter Mayes
Virgin Records singles